John Carty is an Irish musician. Considered by many as one of Ireland’s best traditional musicians, Carty plays fiddle, tenor banjo, tenor guitar and occasionally the flute. He is very interested in the North Connacht traditional music style.

Carty was born in London and now lives in Boyle, County Roscommon.

His first fiddle album, Last Night's Fun, which released on Shanachie Records in 1996 has been described as a milestone in recorded fiddle music.

In 2003, he was awarded Traditional Musician of the Year by the Irish Television station TG4. The award placed him in the company of previous winners, such as Matt Molloy and Paddy Keenan.

Discography 
The Cat that Ate the Candle (1994)
Last Night's Fun (1996)
Yeh That's All It Is (2001)
At It Again (2003)
Upon My Soul - James Carty (2006)
Pathway To the Well (2007)
On the Fly (2007)
It's Not Racket Science - At the Racket (2008)
I Will If I Can (2005)
Meadbh (The Crimson Path) (2010) 
At Complete Ease (2011)
The Cat That Ate The Candle (2011)
John Carty & Brian Rooney (2011)
The Good Mixer (2015)

References

Year of birth missing (living people)
Living people
Musicians from County Roscommon
People from Boyle, County Roscommon
Patrick Street members